This is a timeline of machine translation. For a more detailed qualitative account, see the history of machine translation page.

Timeline

See also

 Timeline of machine learning

References

Machine translation
Machine translation